Milton Merl Goering (October 12, 1923 – October 15, 2009) was an American football coach.  He was the head football coach for the Bethel College in North Newton, Kansas, serving for five seasons, from 1954 to 1956 and again from 1958 to 1959, compiling a record of 15–27–2. Goering was also director of athletics and dean of students at a point at Bethel. He is a member of the Bethel College Athletic Hall of Fame. He died in 2009. His daughter, Susan Goering, became an influential civil rights lawyer in Maryland.

Head coaching record

References

External links
 

1923 births
2009 deaths
Bethel Threshers athletic directors
Bethel Threshers football coaches
People from McPherson, Kansas